Devils Glacier is a heavily crevassed glacier at the edge of the polar plateau, about  long and  wide, draining the southern part of the Mohn Basin and flowing northeast to enter the upper part of Amundsen Glacier just north of the mountain group consisting of Mounts Wisting, Hassel, Bjaaland and Prestrud.

The glacier was encountered by Roald Amundsen's South Pole Party in 1911 and was named by them to describe the extremely rough sledging in the area. Amundsen's route southward, between 168°W and 169°W, took the party across the upper or western portion of the glacier.

See also
 List of glaciers in the Antarctic
 Glaciology

References 

Glaciers of the Ross Dependency
Amundsen Coast